Gus Young (born 19 September 1961) is a Jamaican sprinter. He competed in the men's 100 metres at the 1984 Summer Olympics.

References

1961 births
Living people
Athletes (track and field) at the 1984 Summer Olympics
Jamaican male sprinters
Olympic athletes of Jamaica
Place of birth missing (living people)